Ricardo Denver Mackenzie is a South African politician who has served as the Minister of Mobility of the Western Cape since February 2023. A member of the Democratic Alliance, he has been a Member of the Western Cape Provincial Parliament since May 2014.

Mackenzie is a former Manager/PA to African National Congress member and national cabinet minister Fikile Mbalula. He is also the DA's constituency head in Mitchells Plain.

Early life
Mackenzie studied at the University of the Witswatersrand where he obtained a graduate certificate in governance and leadership. As of 2019, he is studying for a post-graduate diploma in governance. He worked for the Presidency, Old Mutual, and JPMorgan Chase before being appointed Manager/PA to the then-Minister of Sport and Recreation Fikile Mbalula.

Political career
In January 2014, Mackenzie announced that he had resigned as Mbalula's Manager/PA and as a member of the African National Congress. He joined the Democratic Alliance and was announced as a candidate for the Western Cape Provincial Parliament ahead of the 2014 general election. He was elected and sworn in as an MPP on 21 May 2014. During the fifth term of the provincial parliament, he served as the chairperson of the Standing Committee on Cultural Affairs and Sports.

Mackenzie was re-elected in the 2019 provincial election. He is the DA's constituency head in Mitchells Plain. In June 2019, he was elected as the chairperson of the Standing Committee on the Premier and Constitutional Matters.

Provincial government
On 14 February 2023, Weekend Argus reported that Mackenzie was touted as the next Minister of Mobility in the Western Cape following Daylin Mitchell's departure from the position after he was elected Speaker of the Provincial Parliament in December 2022. On 20 February, Mackenzie was appointed to the position by Premier Alan Winde.

References

External links

Living people
Year of birth missing (living people)
Coloured South African people
University of the Witwatersrand alumni
21st-century South African politicians
Politicians from Cape Town
Democratic Alliance (South Africa) politicians
African National Congress politicians
Members of the Western Cape Provincial Parliament